Kubu Lembi (born 19 August 1972) is a retired Congolese football midfielder. He was a squad member at the 1994 Africa Cup of Nations.

References

1972 births
Living people
Democratic Republic of the Congo footballers
Democratic Republic of the Congo international footballers
1994 African Cup of Nations players
Daring Club Motema Pembe players
K.S.C. Lokeren Oost-Vlaanderen players
Royal Antwerp F.C. players
K.S.V. Waregem players
HSV Hoek players
Dunaújváros FC players
Association football midfielders
Democratic Republic of the Congo expatriate footballers
Expatriate footballers in Belgium
Democratic Republic of the Congo expatriate sportspeople in Belgium
Belgian Pro League players
Expatriate footballers in the Netherlands
Democratic Republic of the Congo expatriate sportspeople in the Netherlands
Expatriate footballers in Hungary
Democratic Republic of the Congo expatriate sportspeople in Hungary
21st-century Democratic Republic of the Congo people